This is a list of notable events in country music that took place, or will take place, in 2023.

Events
January 6 – Marty Stuart invites Henry Cho and Gary Mule Deer to become the newest members of the Grand Ole Opry, the first time comedians have been invited in almost 50 years following Jerry Clower in 1973. Cho is the first Asian person to become a member of the Opry.
January 23 – Gabby Barrett's "Pick Me Up", Lainey Wilson's "Heart Like a Truck" and Carly Pearce's "What He Didn't Do", all reach #4, #8 and #10 respectively at US Country Radio (as measured by Mediabase). This marks the first time since 2020 that three solo women have charted in the top ten simultaneously.
February 11 – Kane Brown and his wife Katelyn Brown top the Country Airplay chart with "Thank God", making it the second duet by a married couple to top that chart following Tim McGraw and Faith Hill's "It's Your Love" in 1997.

Top hits of the year
The following songs placed within the Top 20 on the Hot Country Songs, Country Airplay, or Canada Country charts in 2023:

Singles released by American and Australian artists

Singles released by Canadian artists

Top new album releases

Other top albums

Announced

Deaths
January 4 – Stan Hitchcock, 86, singer-songwriter and co-founder of CMT.
January 5 – Mark Capps, 54, sound engineer, record producer and son of musician Jimmy Capps (shot by SWAT team).
January 8 – Slim Newton, 90, Australian country music singer-songwriter (The Redback on the Toilet Seat).
January 9 – Dick Flood, 90, singer-songwriter and naturalist.
January 12 – Lisa Marie Presley, 54, singer-songwriter and only child of Elvis Presley.
January 26 – Peter McCann, 74, singer-songwriter ("Nobody Falls Like a Fool", "She's Single Again") 
January 30 – Pat Bunch, 83, songwriter ("I'll Still Be Loving You", "Safe in the Arms of Love", "Wild One") 
February 8 – Burt Bacharach, 94, pianist-composer ("The Story of My Life" and "Any Day Now" on the country charts).
February 17 – Kyle Jacobs, 49, songwriter ("More Than a Memory") and husband of Kellie Pickler.
 March 4 – Michael Rhodes, 69, session bass guitarist

Major awards

Academy of Country Music Awards 
(presented on May 11, 2023)

Americana Music Honors & Awards 
Artist of the Year – 
Duo/Group of the Year – 
Album of the Year – 
Song of the Year – 
Emerging Act of the Year –
Instrumentalist of the Year –
President's Award – 
Lifetime Achievement Award - 
Free Speech/Inspiration Award – 
Lifetime Achievement Award for Performance – 
Lifetime Achievement Award for Producer/Engineer – 
Legacy of Americana Award –

American Music Awards 
Favorite Country Album – 
Favorite Country Song –
Favorite Male Country Artist – 
Favorite Female Country Artist – 
Favorite Country Duo/Group –

ARIA Awards 
Best Country Album -

Billboard Music Awards 
 Top Country Artist – 
 Top Male Country Artist –
 Top Female Country Artist – 
 Top Country Duo/Group – 
 Top Country Album – 
 Top Country Song – 
 Top Country Tour –

Canadian Country Music Association Awards 

Entertainer of the Year -
Fan Choice -
Album of the Year - 
Alternative Country Album of the Year - 
Male Artist of the Year - 
Female Artist of the Year - 
Group or Duo of the Year -
Interactive Artist/Group of the Year - 
Rising Star - 
Single of the Year - 
Songwriter of the Year - 
Video of the Year - 
Top Selling Canadian Album of the Year - 
Top Selling Canadian Single of the Year - 
Producer of the Year - 
Guitar Player of the Year -  
Bass Player of the Year - 
Drummer of the Year - 
Fiddle Player of the Year - 
Steel Guitar Player of the Year - 
Keyboard Player of the Year - 
Specialty Instrument Player of the Year -
Top Selling International Album -

CMT Music Awards 
(presented on April 2, 2023)

CMT Artists of the Year

Country Music Association Awards 
 Entertainer of the Year – 
 Male Vocalist of the Year –
 Female Vocalist of the Year – 
 Vocal Group of the Year – 
 New Artist of the Year – 
 Vocal Duo of the Year – 
 Musician of the Year –
 Single of the Year – 
 Song of the Year – 
 Album of the Year – 
 Musical Event of the Year – 
 Video of the Year – 
 Willie Nelson Lifetime Achievement Award –

Grammy Awards 
 Best Country Solo Performance – 
 Best Country Duo/Group Performance – 
 Best Country Song –
 Best Country Album – 
 Best Bluegrass Album – 
 Best Americana Album – 
 Best American Roots Performance –
 Best Americana Performance –
 Best American Roots Song – 
 Best Roots Gospel Album –

International Bluegrass Music Awards 
Entertainer of the Year – 
Male Vocalist of the Year – 
Female Vocalist of the Year –
Vocal Group of the Year –  
Instrumental Group of the Year –
New Artist of the Year – 
Album of the Year – 
Song of the Year – 
Gospel Recording of the Year – 
Instrumental Recording of the Year – 
Collaborative Recording of the Year – 
Guitar Player of the Year –
Banjo Player of the Year – 
Fiddle Player of the Year – 
Mandolin Player of the Year –
Bass Player of the Year – 
Resophonic Guitar Player of the Year –

Juno Awards 
Country Album of the Year –

References 

Country
Country music by year
Culture-related timelines by year